Vicko Ruić (born 1959) is a Croatian film director, screenwriter, producer and actor.

Ruić graduated from the Acting Department of the Academy of Dramatic Art in Zagreb. His directorial debut, Nausikaya (1996), which Ruić also wrote and produced, was the first Croatian independent film, and was Croatia's submission to the 69th Academy Awards for the Academy Award for Best Foreign Language Film.

Filmography

Director
Nausikaya (Nausikaja, 1996)
Serafim, the Lighthouse Keeper's Son (Serafin, svjetioničarev sin, 2002)
The Recollection Thief (Kradljivac uspomena, 2007)

References

External links
Profile at film.hr 

1959 births
Croatian male actors
Croatian film directors
Film people from Split, Croatia
Living people
Croatian screenwriters